Perrine Laffont (born 28 October 1998) is a French mogul skier and the 2017 Dual Moguls world champion and moguls silver medalist. She won the gold medal at the 2018 Winter Olympic Games in the moguls event, and was back-to-back overall winner of the FIS Freestyle Ski World Cup in the 2018–19 and 2019–20 seasons.

On 8 March 2021, Perrine Laffont won the single mogul skiing event at the world championships on the Almaty piste in Kazakhstan.

Olympic results
 1 medals – (1 gold)

World Championships results
 7 medals – (5 gold, 1 silver and 1 bronze)

Junior World Championships results
 5 medals – (3 gold and 2 bronze)

See also
Freestyle skiing at the 2014 Winter Olympics – Women's moguls

References

External links

Freestyle skiers at the 2014 Winter Olympics
Freestyle skiers at the 2018 Winter Olympics
Freestyle skiers at the 2022 Winter Olympics
French female freestyle skiers
1998 births
Olympic freestyle skiers of France
Living people
Medalists at the 2018 Winter Olympics
Olympic gold medalists for France
Olympic medalists in freestyle skiing
Université Savoie-Mont Blanc alumni
Sportspeople from Ariège (department)
21st-century French women